The 2020 Illinois judicial elections consisted of both partisan and retention elections, including those for three seats on the Supreme Court of Illinois and 10 seats in the Illinois Appellate Court. Primary elections were held on March 17, 2020, and the general election was held on November 3, 2020. These elections were part of the 2020 Illinois elections.

Supreme Court of Illinois
Justices of the Supreme Court of Illinois are elected by district. Two seats will be holding partisan elections, while another will be holding a retention election. On the Supreme Court of Illinois, seats  occupied by previously-elected justices will see retention elections, while races with justices not previously elected (whether the seat is vacant or filled by an appointee) will see competitive partisan elections.

The court has seven seats total separated into five districts. The first district, representing Cook County, contains three seats, making it a multi-member district, while other four districts are single-member districts. Justices hold ten year terms.

1st district
One of the three seats from the 1st district is up for a partisan election. Incumbent P. Scott Neville Jr. was appointed to the Supreme Court in 2018 to fill the vacancy left by the retirement of Charles E. Freeman. This is a regularly-scheduled election (Freeman's term would have ended in December 2020).

Democratic primary

Republican primary 
No candidates were included on the ballot in the Republican primary. While an official write-in candidate did run, he did not receive a sufficient number of votes to win nomination.

Results

General election

5th district
Lloyd Karmeier, a Republican, retired on December 6, 2019, leaving the seat vacant until the election. This is a regularly-scheduled election (Karmeier's term would have ended in December 2020). Three members of the Illinois Appellate Court from the 5th district chose to run; John B. Barberis, Jr, Judy Cates, and David K. Overstreet.

Democratic primary

Republican primary

General election

Retention elections
The 3rd district seat was held by Thomas L. Kilbride, a Democrat first elected to the Supreme Court in 2000.

In the 2nd district, Robert R. Thomas, a Republican, was scheduled to have retention election. However, he retired February 29, 2020. On March 1, 2020, Michael J. Burke assumed his seat, and will hold it until a special election in 2022.

To be retained, judges are required to have 60% of their vote be "yes". Kilbride did not reach that mark and only receiving approximately 57% of the vote. He is the first justice of the Illinois Supreme Court to lose retention vote in the history of the state.

Illinois Appellate Court
Illinois Appellate Court justices hold ten-year terms.

1st district (1st division)
Incumbent John C. Griffin was appointed in May 2018 following the retirement of John B. Simon. This is a special election for a four-year term, as Simon's term would not have ended until 2024. Griffin ran for reelection, but was unseated in the Democratic primary by Sharon Oden-Johnson.

Democratic primary

Republican primary
The Republican primary was cancelled. No candidates had filed.

General election

1st district (3rd division)
Incumbent Michael Hyman was appointed in 2018 to fill the vacancy left when P. Scott Neville Jr. resigned this seat to assume a seat on the Supreme Court of Illinois. He was elected outright.

Democratic primary

Republican primary 
No candidates were included on the ballot in the Republican primary. While an official write-in candidate did run, he did not receive a sufficient number of votes to win nomination.

Results

General election

5th district
Incumbent Mark M. Boie was appointed on May 1, 2019.

Democratic primary

Republican primary

General election

Retention elections
To be retained, judges are required to have 60% of their vote be "yes".

Lower courts

Lower courts also saw judicial elections.

References

Judicial
2020